Orlando Diogo de Oliveira, commonly known as Diogo Orlando (born December 4, 1983 in Volta Redonda, Rio de Janeiro), is a Brazilian footballer who plays for Sampaio Corrêa as a defensive midfielder.

Career statistics

(Correct )

Honours
Volta Redonda
 Campeonato Carioca Série B: 2004

Vitória
 Campeonato Capixaba: 2006

Jaguaré 
 Copa Espírito Santo: 2007

Avaí
 Campeonato Catarinense: 2012

Ceará
 Campeonato Cearense: 2013

Santo André 
 Campeonato Paulista Série A2: 2016

References

External links
 
  Central Brasileirão

1983 births
Living people
People from Volta Redonda
Brazilian footballers
Association football midfielders
Campeonato Brasileiro Série A players
Campeonato Brasileiro Série B players
Campeonato Brasileiro Série D players
Volta Redonda FC players
Associação Jaguaré Esporte Clube players
Vitória Futebol Clube (ES) players
Americano Futebol Clube players
Mirassol Futebol Clube players
Associação Desportiva São Caetano players
Avaí FC players
Ceará Sporting Club players
Esporte Clube Santo André players
Associação Portuguesa de Desportos players
Gostaresh Foulad F.C. players
Associação Olímpica de Itabaiana players
Sampaio Corrêa Futebol Clube players
União Recreativa dos Trabalhadores players
Sportspeople from Rio de Janeiro (state)